The Women's Camanachd Association (WCA) Challenge Cup is the second-tier trophy in women's shinty. It is currently sponsored by Mowi (formerly Marine Harvest) who have sponsored the cup since 2014. It is played on a knock-out basis by the teams in the National Division 2 Leagues and is administered by the Women's Camanachd Association. The current holders are Lovat.

The Challenge Cup is usually played just before the Women's Shinty Premier Cup competition. The Valerie Fraser Trophy and the two cup finals form a showpiece event in the women's shinty calendar.

Final history

The trophy has been played for since 2012, when Lochaber defeated Strathglass in the final in the inaugural final.

Strathglass were successful in 2013, beating Glasgow Mid Argyll.

The following year Strathglass retained the trophy, this time beating Lovat 6–4 in the final.

The 2015 final was an exciting affair. After a goalless first half, Lauren Pike put GMA in front before Kate Bradley retaliated for Ardnamurchan. Carolanne Cameron then gave Ardnamurchan team the lead with just four minutes left. In the final minute Kirsty Gray equalised and the game went to extra time. The drama continued when Geraldine Murphy gave the lead back to GMA before Cameron scored again for the west highlanders. GMA triumphed 2–0 in the penalty shout out.

Lovat secured their first Challenge Cup win with a comprehensive 7–1 victory over Strathglass in 2016.

The 2017 final saw the 2015 runners-up Ardnamurchan again lose out this time to Glengarry who put their name on the trophy for the first time with an emphatic 7–1 win which included a five-minute hat-trick from Leona Falconer.

In 2018 two players scored hat-tricks in the final. Glenurguhart teenager Abby Stoddart got hers in the first half. Inverness's Katie Macmillan achieved the same feat but the decisive Glenurquhart goal came from Hazel Hunter's 50th-minute penalty.

The 2019 final saw Inverness fall at the final hurdle again, and again two players scored hat-tricks. This time the victors were Lovat who ran out 7-1 winners. Fiona Urquhart and Lovat captain Laura Gallacher both scored hat-tricks.

Previous winners
2019 - Lovat 7 v 1 Inverness, The Dell, Kingussie
2018 - Glenurquhart 4 v 3 Inverness, The Dell, Kingussie
2017 - Glengarry 7 v 1 Ardnamurchan, An Aird, Fort William
2016 - Lovat 7 v 1 Strathglass, An Aird, Fort William
2015 - Glasgow Mid Argyll 3 v 3 (A.E.T.) Ardnamurchan, The Bught, Inverness (GMA won 2–0 on penalties)
2014 - Strathglass 6 v 4 Lovat, Strachurmore
2013 - Strathglass bt Glasgow Mid Argyll, Eilan, Newtonmore
2012 - Lochaber bt Strathglass

Winners of Challenge Cup for Women

Runners-up of Challenge Cup for Women

References

1991 in sports
1991 in Scottish sport
Awards established in 1991
Sports trophies and awards
Shinty competitions
1991 establishments in Scotland